Francisco Moreira Silva Rebelo (born 12 October 1947 in Setúbal) is a former Portuguese footballer who played for Vitória Setúbal and Amora, as right back.

Rebelo gained 8 caps for the Portugal national team.

External links 
 

1947 births
Living people
Sportspeople from Setúbal
Vitória F.C. players
Portugal international footballers
Portuguese footballers
Primeira Liga players
Association football defenders